The Wake Island Device is an award device of the United States military which is presented as a campaign clasp to both the Navy and Marine Corps Expeditionary Medals.

The Wake Island Device is authorized for any sailor or marine who was awarded the Navy or Marine Corps Expeditionary Medal due to service during the defense of Wake Island during the opening days of U.S. involvement in the Second World War.  To be awarded the Wake Island Device, a service member must have been awarded either the Navy Expeditionary Medal, or the Marine Corps Expeditionary Medal, and must have served on Wake Island between the dates of December 7 and December 22, 1941.

The Wake Island Device is worn as a campaign clasp, inscribed with the words “Wake Island”, centered on the upper portion of the Navy or Marine Corps Expeditionary Medal.  When wearing the Expeditionary Medal as a ribbon, the Wake Island Device is annotated by a silver “W” device, centered on the decoration.

A total of only 449 Marine Corps and 68 Navy personnel were eligible for the Wake Island Device, making it one of the rarest of United States military awards.  (As a point of comparison, there were a total of 472 Medal of Honor recipients during World War II.)

See also
Awards and decorations of the United States military

Devices and accouterments of United States military awards
Battle of Wake Island